The Station Mall, is a shopping mall located in Sault Ste. Marie, Ontario, Canada. Built in 1973, the mall has since undergone two major expansions. Its major tenants include  Galaxy Cinemas movie theatre complex. The mall is located on the waterfront in downtown Sault Ste. Marie, and is roughly five minutes away from the Sault Ste. Marie International Bridge to the United States. The Sault Ste. Marie railway station is located in the mall's parking lot.

History

Phase I (1973)
Station Mall opened on October 31, 1973 with 284,000 square feet of retail space and 45 tenants, including a two-story Sears department store and Dominion Food Stores as its anchors. Other retailers when the mall opened in 1973 included Lakeshore Drug Mart, People's Jewelers, Lighting Unlimited, Davis II men's wear, Big Steel, Dalmys, Fairweather, Penningtons, Laura Secord Candies, Coles - The Book People, Melody Lane Record Shop, The Leather Touch, Kinney Shoes, Dolomity Shoes, Tip Top Stores, Happy Hour Card 'n Party Shop, and the Loon's Nest. The 400-seat Station Cinema opened with the mall, as did J.B.'s Big Boy Family Restaurant. The original "Pufferbelly" food court included space for a delicatessen and 10 snack bars. A departure from downtown retailers at the time, the mall advertised free parking for 1,800 cars and a climate-controlled shopping experience.

The original construction was part of a $30 million development of the Algoma Central Railway's Bay Street property, which also included the construction of a 200-room hotel near the mall, originally occupied by Holiday Inn.

The original building was designed by James A. Murray, Architects and built by Eastern Construction Co. Ltd.

The mall underwent two expansions in 16 years, in 1981 and 1989, adding more than 200,000 square feet of additional retail space.

Phase II (1981)
Before it had even opened, plans were already underway for a 150,000 square feet expansion to add another department store, 20 additional retail stores, a second cinema, a third large restaurant as well as parking for 200 additional cars.

Phase III (1989)
The mall's Phase III expansion continued its westward growth with the addition of Zellers as an anchor store at the western end. With its opening in the fall of 1989, the new phase brought the total number of stores, shops and restaurants to 115. Among the new or relocated stores in Phase III were Lady's a Champ/Frat House; Sam the Record Man; Footlocker; Rafters; CAA Travel; Pantorama; Cotton Ginny, Saan for Kids, and Beef n' Brand Restaurant.

2000 expansion
In 2000, the 52,000-square-foot Galaxy Entertainment Complex was opened on the waterfront side of the mall. The Complex includes a 12-screen, 2,400 seat movie theatre. The mall underwent a major renovation project, adding large format stores and revamping the interior. 2011 saw a number of smaller stores combined for a new Sport Chek location. The small former Zellers location reopened in 2012 as a smaller Walmart Supercentre. On November 25, 2013, Galaxy Cinemas downsized from 12 screens to 7 screens in order to make room for H&M. In October 2017, Sears Canada permanently closed their Station Mall store, leaving Coles, Lakeshore Drug Mart, Laura Secord and the Vacation Station as the only remaining original tenants of the mall. In May 2019, Walmart announced that its store in the mall would close in June of that year. This left the mall without any major anchor stores.

Anchor tenants
Galaxy Cinema (32,000 sq ft)
Sport Chek (22,000 sq ft)
H&M (18,000 sq ft)
Dollarama (11,000 sq ft)

Former tenants

A&A Records
 Beef n' Brand Restaurant
Bentley
Bulk Barn
 CAA Travel
 Cotton Ginny
 Dalmys Canada Ltd.
 DavidsTea (Tea store)
 Dominion (supermarket)
 Foot Locker
 Freshly Squeezed
 Garage (clothing retailer)
 HMV Canada
 Joey's Twisted Italian Grill & Pub
 Kelly's Grocery
 Lady's A Champ / Frat House
Leisure World
 Live in Leather
 Melody Lane Records & Tape
 Morse Jewellers
 Music World
 Pantorama
 Rafters
Regis Salon
 Sam the Record Man
 San Francisco (gifts)
 Sann for Kids
 Sears Canada
 Swiss Chalet
 Target Canada (planned but fell through, eventually opening as Walmart)
 Teavana (Tea Store)
 Walmart
 Wendy's China Cabinet
 Work World
 Zellers

References 

Buildings and structures in Sault Ste. Marie, Ontario
Shopping malls in Ontario
Shopping malls established in 1973
Tourist attractions in Algoma District